Frank Samuel "Pee Wee" Austin (May 22, 1917 – January 15, 1960) was a Panamanian professional baseball player.

He was a shortstop in the Negro leagues and minor leagues. He played professionally from 1944 to 1956, playing with the Philadelphia Stars of the Negro National League from 1944 to 1948. He played in the 1945 East-West All-Star Game. Austin played in the International League in 1949, and the Pacific Coast League from 1949 to 1956. Although he never played in the Major Leagues, Austin was one of the first two black players to play for the New York Yankees organization in 1949 along with Luis Marquez.

References

External links
 and Seamheads

1917 births
1960 deaths
Newark Bears (IL) players
Panamanian expatriate baseball players in Canada
Philadelphia Stars players
Portland Beavers players
Sabios de Vargas players
Vancouver Mounties players
20th-century African-American sportspeople
Baseball infielders